The 2011–12 season of Alemannia Aachen began on 16 July 2011 with the first game in the 2. Bundesliga.

Transfers

Summer transfers 

In:

Out:

Winter transfers

In:

Out:

Statistics

Goals and appearances

|-
|colspan="14"|Players sold or loaned out after the start of the season:

|}
Last updated: 6 May 2012

Results

2. Bundesliga

League table

DFB-Pokal

References

2011–12
German football clubs 2011–12 season